Beloozyorsky is an urban locality (a town) in Voskresensky District of Moscow Oblast, Russia. Population: 

Beloozyorsky lies on the left bank of the Moscow River 20 km northwest of district's administrative center, Voskresensk. It gained town status on 5 April 2019, being an urban-type settlement before that date. Beloozyorsky is connected with Moscow by the Ryazansky suburban railway line.

References

Cities and towns in Moscow Oblast